Hagar is a biblical woman. According to the Book of Genesis, she was an Egyptian slave, a handmaiden of Sarah (then known as Sarai), whom Sarah gave to her own husband Abram (later renamed Abraham) as a wife to bear him a child. Abraham's firstborn son, through Hagar, Ishmael, became the progenitor of the Ishmaelites, generally taken to be the Arabs. Various commentators have connected her to the Hagrites (sons of Agar), perhaps claiming her as their eponymous ancestor. Hagar is alluded to, although not named, in the Quran, and Islam considers her Abraham's second wife.

Life

Abraham and Hagar 
According to the Bible, Hagar was the Egyptian slave of Sarai, Abram's wife (whose names later became Sarah and Abraham). Sarai had been barren for a long time and sought a way to fulfill God's promise that Abram would be father of many nations, especially since they had grown old, so she offered Hagar to Abram to be his concubine.

Hagar became pregnant, and tension arose between the two women. In
the Bible it is seen that Sarai despised Hagar as she had conceived whilst Sarai had not. Abraham gave Sarai the liberty to treat Hagar as she pleases, as it seems at this time that Hagar was considered to be Sarai’s maid. Sarai eventually dealt harshly with Hagar and so she fled. 

Hagar fled into the desert on her way to Shur. At a spring en route, an angel appeared to Hagar, who instructed her to return to Sarai and submit to her mistress, so that she may bear a child who "shall be a wild ass of a man: his hand shall be against every man, and every man's hand against him; and he shall dwell in the face of all his brethren" (Genesis 16:9 - 12). Then she was told to call her son Ishmael. Afterward, Hagar referred to God as "El Roi" (variously "god of sight"; "god saw me"; "god who appears"). She then returned to Abram and Sarai, and soon gave birth to a son, whom she named as the angel had instructed.

There is no direct mention of Hagar in the Quran, which does not declare her explicitly a free woman or as a maid of Sarah or Abraham. Moreover, the notion of Hagar being a slave girl is denied by some modern scholars, who posit instead that Hagar was the daughter of the pharaoh of Egypt, thus making her a princess rather than a slave girl or a bondswoman.

Hagar cast out 
Later, Sarah gave birth to Isaac, and the tension between the women returned. At a celebration after Isaac was weaned, Sarah found the teenage Ishmael mocking her son (Genesis 21:9). She was so upset by the idea of Ishmael inheriting their wealth, that she demanded that Abraham send Hagar and her son away. She declared that Ishmael would not share in Isaac's inheritance. Abraham was greatly distressed but God told Abraham to do as his wife commanded because God's promise would be carried out through Isaac; Ishmael would be made into a great nation as well because he was Abraham's offspring. Before Abraham died, he gave gifts to Ishmael and his other sons and sent them away from Isaac (Genesis 25:6). Ishmael and Isaac buried Abraham together (Genesis 25:9).

Early the next morning, Abraham brought Hagar and Ishmael out together. Abraham gave Hagar bread and water then sent them into the wilderness of Beersheba. She and her son wandered aimlessly until their water was completely consumed. In a moment of despair, she burst into tears. God heard her and her son crying and came to rescue them. The angel opened Hagar's eyes and she saw a well of water.  He also told Hagar that God  would "make a great nation" of Ishmael. Hagar found her son a wife from Egypt and they settled in the Desert of Paran.

The Quranic narrative slightly differs from the Biblical account: it is God alone who commands Abraham to take Hagar and Ishmael down to the desert, later Mecca, and leave them there. Due to the scarcity of water in the desert, it did not take long for both mother and son to suffer from a great thirst, and so Hagar ran between the hills of Safa and Marwah in search of water for her son. After the seventh run between the two hills, an angel appeared before her. He helped her and said that God heard Ishmael cry and would provide them with water, and Hagar found the sacred Zamzam Well. Mecca was later known for its perfection and abundant water and an Arab tribe called the Banu Jurhum settled there with Hagar and her son Ishmael, because of the presence of the water.

Religious views

Rabbinical commentary

Rabbinical commentators asserted that Hagar was Pharaoh's daughter. The midrash Genesis Rabbah states it was when Sarah was in Pharaoh's harem that he gave her his daughter Hagar as servant, saying: "It is better that my daughter should be a servant  in the house of such a woman than mistress in another house". Sarah treated Hagar well, and induced women who came to visit her to visit Hagar also. However Hagar, when pregnant by Abraham, began to act superciliously toward Sarah, provoking the latter to treat her harshly, to impose heavy work upon her, and even to strike her (ib. 16:9).

Some Jewish commentators identify Hagar with Keturah, the woman Abraham married after the death of Sarah, stating that Abraham sought her out after Sarah's death. It is suggested that Keturah was Hagar's personal name, and that "Hagar" was a descriptive label meaning "stranger". This interpretation is discussed in the Midrash and is supported by Rashi, Judah Loew ben Bezalel, Shlomo Ephraim Luntschitz, and Obadiah ben Abraham Bartenura.  Rashi argues that "Keturah" was a name given to Hagar because her deeds were as beautiful as incense, and/or that she remained chaste from the time she was separated from Abraham— derives from the Aramaic word "restrained". The contrary view (that Keturah was someone other than Hagar) is advocated by the Rashbam, Abraham ibn Ezra, David Kimhi, and Nachmanides. They were listed as two different people in the genealogies in the Book of Chronicles (1 Chronicles 1:29–33).

Christianity

In the New Testament, Paul the Apostle made Hagar's experience an allegory of the difference between law and grace in his Epistle to the Galatians. Paul links the laws of the Torah, given on Mount Sinai, to the bondage of the Israelite people, implying that it was signified by Hagar's condition as a bondswoman, while the "free" heavenly Jerusalem is signified by Sarah and her child. The Biblical Mount Sinai has been referred to as "Agar", possibly named after Hagar.

Augustine of Hippo referred to Hagar as symbolizing an "earthly city", or sinful condition of humanity: "In the earthly city (symbolised by Hagar) [...] we find two things, its own obvious presence and the symbolic presence of the heavenly city. New citizens are begotten to the earthly city by nature vitiated by sin but to the heavenly city by grace freeing nature from sin." This view was expounded on by medieval theologians such as Thomas Aquinas and John Wycliffe. The latter compared the children of Sarah to the redeemed, and those of Hagar to the unredeemed, who are "carnal by nature and mere exiles".

The story of Hagar demonstrates that survival is possible even under harshest conditions.

Islam

Hājar or Haajar is the Arabic name used to identify the wife of Abraham and the mother of Ishmael. Although not mentioned by name in the Qur'an, she is referenced and alluded to via the story of her husband. She is a revered woman in the Islamic faith.

According to Muslim belief, she was the Egyptian wife of Ibrāhīm. She eventually settled in the Desert of Paran with her son Ismā'īl. Hājar is honoured as an especially important matriarch of monotheism, as it was through Ismā'īl that Muhammad would come.

Some Modern Muslim scholars are of the opinion that she was never a handmaid of Sarah, rather she was a princess of Egypt who willingly followed Abraham and later married him. They further argue that Hagar and Ishmael were not cast out as claimed by Biblical narrative, but they were settled at Makkah (Paran) for the sake of Almighty Allah.

Neither Sarah nor Hājar is mentioned by name in the Qur'an, but the story is traditionally understood to be referred to in a line from Ibrāhīm's prayer in Surah Ibrahim (14:37): "I have settled some of my family in a barren valley near your Sacred House." While Hājar is not named, the reader lives Hājar's predicament indirectly through the eyes of Ibrāhīm.

Her father was killed by Pharaoh Dhu l-'arsh (meaning "he/master of the throne") and she was captured and taken as a slave. Later, because of her royal blood, she was made mistress of the female slaves and given access to all of Pharaoh's wealth. Upon conversion to Ibrāhīm's faith, the Pharaoh gave Hājar to Sarah who gave her to Ibrāhīm.

According to another tradition, Hājar was the daughter of the Egyptian king, who gave her to Ibrāhīm as a wife, thinking Sarah was his sister. According to Ibn Abbas, Ismā'īl's birth to Hājar caused strife between her and Sarah, who was still barren. Ibrāhīm brought Hājar and their son to a land called Paran-aram or (Faran in Arabic, in latter days held to be the land surrounding Mecca). The objective of this journey was to "resettle" rather than "expel" Hājar. Ibrāhīm left Hājar and Ismā'īl under a tree and provided them with water. Hājar, learning that God had ordered Ibrāhīm to leave her in the desert of Paran, respected his decision. The Muslim belief is that God tested Ibrāhīm by ordering this task.

Hājar soon ran out of water, and Ismā'īl, an infant by that time, began to cry from hunger and thirst. Hājar panicked and ran between two nearby hills, Al-Safa and Al-Marwah, repeatedly in search for water. After her seventh run, an angel appeared over the location of the Zamzam and then hit the ground with his heel (or his wing) and caused a miraculous well to spring out of the ground. This is called the Zamzam Well and is located a few metres from the Kaaba in Mecca.

The incident of her running between the Al-Safa and Al-Marwah hills is remembered by Muslims when they perform their pilgrimage (Hajj) at Mecca. Part of the pilgrimage is to run seven times between the hills, in commemoration of Hājar's courage and faith in God as she searched for water in the desert (which is believed to have then miraculously appeared from the Zamzam Well), and to symbolize the celebration of motherhood in Islam. To complete the task, some Muslims also drink from the Zamzam Well and take some of the water back home from pilgrimage in memory of Hājar.

Baháʼí traditions
According to the Baháʼí Faith, the Báb was a descendant of Abraham and Hagar, and God made a promise to spread Abraham's seed. The Baháʼí Publishing House released a text on the wives and concubines of Abraham and traces their lineage to five different religions.

Arts and literature

Many artists have painted scenes from the story of Hagar and Ishmael in the desert, including  Pieter Lastman, Gustave Doré, Frederick Goodall and James Eckford Lauder. William Shakespeare refers to Hagar in The Merchant of Venice Act II Scene 5 line 40 when Shylock says "What says that fool of Hagar's offspring, ha?" This line refers to the character Launcelot, whom Shylock is insulting by comparing him to the outcast Ishmael. It also reverses the conventional Christian interpretation by portraying the Christian character as the outcast.

Hagar's destitution and desperation are used as an excuse for criminality by characters in the work of Daniel Defoe, such as Moll Flanders, and the conventional view of Hagar as the mother of outcasts is repeated in Samuel Taylor Coleridge's play Zapolya, whose heroine is assured that she is "no Hagar's offspring; thou art the rightful heir to an appointed king."

In the 19th century a more sympathetic portrayal became prominent, especially in America. Edmonia Lewis, the early African-American and Native American sculptor, made Hagar the subject of one of her most well-known works. She said it was inspired by "strong sympathy for all women who have struggled and suffered". In novels and poems Hagar herself, or characters named Hagar, were depicted as unjustly suffering exiles. These include the long dramatic poem Hagar by Eliza Jane Poitevent Nicholson (pen name Pearl Rivers), president of the National Woman's Press Association; Hagar in the Wilderness by Nathaniel Parker Willis, the highest-paid magazine writer of his day; and Hagar's Farewell by Augusta Moore. In 1913 this was joined by the overtly feminist novel Hagar, by the American Southern socialist and suffragist Mary Johnston's. Hall Caine gave the name A Son of Hagar to 1885 book set in contemporary England and dealing with the theme of illegitimacy.

A similarly sympathetic view prevails in more recent literature. The novel The Stone Angel by Margaret Laurence has a protagonist named Hagar married to a man named Bram, whose life story loosely imitates that of the biblical Hagar. A character named Hagar is prominently featured in Toni Morrison's novel Song of Solomon, which features numerous Biblical themes and allusions. In the 1979 novel Kindred, by Octavia Butler, the protagonist Dana has an ancestor named Hagar (born into slavery) whom we meet towards the end of the novel, as part of Dana's time travel back to Maryland in the 19th century. Hagar is mentioned briefly in Salman Rushdie's controversial novel The Satanic Verses, where Mecca is replaced with 'Jahilia', a desert village built on sand and served by Hagar's spring. Hagar is mentioned, along with Bilhah and Zilpah, in Margaret Atwood's The Handmaid's Tale, a dystopian novel which centres around the women whose duty it is to produce children for their masters, assuming the place of their wives in a rape ceremony based upon the biblical passage. In the recent book of nonfiction, The Woman Who Named God: Abraham's Dilemma and the Birth of Three Faiths, by Charlotte Gordon provides an account of Hagar's life from the perspectives of the three monotheistic religions, Islam, Judaism, and Christianity. In 2019, Nyasha Junior published a book on Hagar entitled Reimaging Hagar: Blackness and Bible which provides a reception history of Hagar that focuses on interpretations of Hagar as a black woman and particularly those interpretations of Hagar that are made by African Americans.

Contemporary influence

Israel
Since the 1970s, the custom has arisen of giving the name "Hagar" to newborn female babies. The giving of this name is often taken as a controversial political act, marking the parents as being supporters of reconciliation with the Palestinians and the Arab world, and is frowned upon by many, including nationalists and the religious. The connotations of the name were represented by the founding of the Israeli journal Hagar: Studies in Culture, Polity and Identities in 2000.

African Americans
Several black American feminists have written about Hagar, comparing her story to those of slaves in American history. Wilma Bailey, in an article entitled "Hagar: A Model for an Anabaptist Feminist", refers to her as a "maidservant" and "slave". She sees Hagar as a model of "power, skills, strength and drive". In the article "A Mistress, A Maid, and No Mercy", Renita J. Weems argues that the relationship between Sarah and Hagar exhibits "ethnic prejudice exacerbated by economic and social exploitation".

Assisted reproduction
Hagar bearing a child for an infertile woman is an example of what is now called surrogacy or contractual gestation, except in Hagar's case she had no choice in the matter. Critics of this and other assisted reproductive technologies have used Hagar in their analysis. As early as 1988, Anna Goldman-Amirav in Reproductive and Genetic Engineering wrote of Hagar within "the Biblical 'battle of the wombs' [which] lay the foundation for the view of women, fertility, and sexuality in the patriarchal society".

See also
 Abraham and Hagar
 Abraham and Ishmael
 Lech-Lecha
 Vayera
 Hagar in Islam

Notes

References

External links

 
20th-century BC people
20th-century BC women
Family of Abraham
Ancestors of Muhammad
Adnanites
Ancient Egyptian women
Ancient Egyptians
Angelic visionaries
Ancient slaves
Lech-Lecha
Vayeira
Women in the Hebrew Bible
Egyptian slaves
Slave concubines